Oleksiy Polyanskyi (born 12 April 1986 in Avdiyivka, Donetsk Oblast, Ukrainian SSR) is a retired Ukrainian footballer.

Club career

Persepolis
Polyanskyi signed with Persian Gulf Pro League club Persepolis in the summer of 2016. He made his first start in January 2017 in a 2–0 victory against Saba Qom.

External links 
 Profile on Official Shakhtar website
 

1986 births
Living people
People from Avdiivka
Ukrainian footballers
Ukraine under-21 international footballers
Ukraine youth international footballers
Association football midfielders
Ukrainian Premier League players
Persian Gulf Pro League players
FC Shakhtar Donetsk players
FC Metalurh Donetsk players
FC Mariupol players
FC Zorya Luhansk players
FC Hoverla Uzhhorod players
FC Metalist Kharkiv players
Ukrainian expatriate footballers
Persepolis F.C. players
Expatriate footballers in Iran
Ukrainian expatriate sportspeople in Iran